Lee Redmond (born February 2, 1941) is an American woman who held the record in the Guinness World Records for longest fingernails on both hands.

Guinness World Records

The Enquirer featured her every few years and kept track of the progress of her nails.

Redmond started growing her nails in late 1978 to early 1979 and although she had originally planned to have them cut off on November 22, 2006 (as she said on her guest appearances on a couple of talk shows), she chose to keep her nails after all. In the past few years, she made appearances on CBS News and at the Ripley's Believe It or Not! museum. One of her last appearances was at a fundraiser for the Salt Lake City fire department, where it was reported her nails were an average of 86-89 centimetres (34–35 in) in length. 

During the time when she had her long nails, she enjoyed activities such as riding bikes with her younger sister Sierra, who had normal nails.  She stated that, while certain activities such as putting on a heavy coat were troublesome, she managed her daily life without much difficulty. On the Guinness TV feature, she was shown driving a car, vacuuming, doing dishes, and giving haircuts to her grandchildren.

On February 10, 2009, her record-setting nails were broken off when she was ejected from a car in a four-car pile-up in Holladay, Utah. Her injuries were serious, but not life-threatening.

In a Huffington Post story published on September 3, 2009, it was stated that: 
"Lee Redmond, who lost the fingernails in February, says it's now much easier to do things and her hands seem to fly with the weight of the nails gone. The 68-year-old won't grow her nails out again, saying it took 30 years the first time, and she may not live for another 30." Her nails are currently about 10 centimetres (4 in) long, however.

Personal life
Lee currently resides in Salt Lake City, Utah. She has two sons and a daughter; two granddaughters, two grandsons, and two great-grandchildren.

She added that her long nails did not even interfere with her care of her husband, who suffers from Alzheimer's disease.

Filmography

Television

See also 
 Shridhar Chillal, who holds the world record for the longest fingernails ever reached on a single hand.

References

Living people
People from Salt Lake City
1941 births
World record holders